"Bounce" is a song by Australian singer Samantha Jade. It was originally released as the first single from her fifth studio album on 20 September 2019, However the album was scrapped when Jade left Sony Music Australia in 2022. The song was co-written by Jade.

Background
In an interview with the Star Observer, Jade explained that "Bounce" "not only focuses on the spring step that comes from being loved but also centres on the personal growth that comes from loving another. [...] Basically, it's a song about love. But it's about that person you meet that puts a bounce in your step and makes you want to be better, and as it says in the bridge 'love harder' and do better, and just be a better person. I think that's a very different love [compared] to that kind of obsessive love. It's a better love." She has described the song as "R&B pop and it feels very natural for me. It's a return to my roots with the music I started doing when I was 17."

Promotion
To promote the single, Jade was announced to perform at the final of the ninth season of Australia's Got Talent on 22 September 2019.

Music video
The music video for "Bounce" premiered on YouTube on 11 October 2019, and features Jade with dancers in yellow outfits against a yellow backdrop, alternated with pink outfits and a pink backdrop.

Reception
On 26 September 2019, The Music Network confirmed that "Bounce" was the most added song to Australian radio for that week.

Track listing

Charts

Release history

References

2019 songs
2019 singles
Samantha Jade songs
Sony Music Australia singles
Songs written by Carmen Reece
Songs written by Samantha Jade